L'Aiglon is a play in six acts by Edmond Rostand based on the life of Napoleon II, who was the son of Emperor Napoleon I and his second wife, Empress Marie Louise. The title of the play comes from a nickname for Napoleon II, the French word for "eaglet" (a young eagle).

The title role was created by Sarah Bernhardt in the play's premiere on 15 March 1900 at the Théàtre Sarah Bernhardt.  
Fashion designer Jacques Doucet designed her famous white costume. 

In October of the same year, the play (in an English translation by Louis N. Parker) premiered at New York's Knickerbocker Theatre, with Maude Adams in the title role.

Its first performance in London was at His Majesty's Theatre in 1901, with Bernhardt again playing the leading role. Rostand had written L'Aiglon specifically for Bernhardt, and it became one of her signature roles.

Clemence Dane made an English translation which was broadcast by the BBC on National Radio in 15 November 1936 and regionally the following day. Marius Goring performed the leading role in this production.

Arthur Honegger and Jacques Ibert composed an opera in five acts, also with the title L'Aiglon, to a libretto by Henri Cain, based on Rostand's play. It was first performed at the Opéra de Monte-Carlo in 1937.

References

New York Times, "Rostand's New Play a Success", 16 March 1900
New York Times, "Maude Adams as the Stricken Eaglet", 23 October 1900
Spratt, Geoffrey K., The music of Arthur Honegger, Cork University Press, 1987, p. 544. 
V&A Archive L'Aiglon radio script

External links

L'Aiglon – complete text in the original French
L'Aiglon – complete text of the English translation by Louis N. Parker
Recording of Sarah Bernhardt in a 4 minute excerpt from L'Aiglon, Vincent Voice Library, Michigan State University

Aiglon
Aiglon
Cultural depictions of Napoleon II